Shakeel Abbasi (b: 5 January 1984, Quetta, Pakistan) is a former international field hockey player from Pakistan. He played as a forward mainly as an inside right or center forward. A skillful forward Abbasi was regarded as one of the finest players for Pakistan in his career making over 300 appearances. He also played for various club sides around the world reputed as a world class player of his era.

Early life 
Abbasi was born in Quetta, Pakistan on 5 January 1984. A good sportsman Abbasi played various sports during his school and college days, influenced by his peers specially his elder brother who recommended him to continue in hockey seeing his promising prospect in it. Abbasi then started giving hockey his full-time attention joining hockey academies in his hometown.

Career

2006
He was part of the team which won the silver medal at the 2006 Commonwealth Games in Melbourne, Australia and the bronze medal at the 2006 Asian Games in Doha, Qatar.

2008
Abbasi was part of the squad which placed 8th at the Beijing Olympics in 2008.

2010
Abbasi was awarded a Category A central contract for the year.

He toured Europe as part of the national team's preparations for the Commonwealth Games in September.

He was part of the sixth place team at the 2010 Commonwealth Games in New Delhi, India. In the first match, he scored Pakistan's opening goal in the 3–0 victory over Scotland.

In November 2010, Abbasi was part of the team at the Asian Games in Guangzhou, China.

2011
Abbasi was part of the Pakistani team that won the silver medal at 2011 Asian Men's Hockey Champions Trophy, Ordos, China.

2012
Abbasi was likely to be picked for the upcoming 2012 Summer Olympics according to Pakistan Hockey Federation secretary Asif Bajwa's reported statement to the news media.

See also
 Pakistan national field hockey team

References

Living people
1984 births
Olympic field hockey players of Pakistan
Pakistani male field hockey players
Male field hockey forwards
Field hockey players at the 2004 Summer Olympics
Field hockey players at the 2008 Summer Olympics
Field hockey players at the 2012 Summer Olympics
Field hockey players at the 2006 Commonwealth Games
Field hockey players at the 2010 Commonwealth Games
Commonwealth Games silver medallists for Pakistan
2006 Men's Hockey World Cup players
2010 Men's Hockey World Cup players
Asian Games medalists in field hockey
Field hockey players at the 2006 Asian Games
Field hockey players at the 2010 Asian Games
Field hockey players at the 2014 Asian Games
Sportspeople from Quetta
World Series Hockey players
Asian Games gold medalists for Pakistan
Asian Games silver medalists for Pakistan
Asian Games bronze medalists for Pakistan
Commonwealth Games medallists in field hockey
Medalists at the 2006 Asian Games
Medalists at the 2010 Asian Games
Medalists at the 2014 Asian Games
Medallists at the 2006 Commonwealth Games